Eucereon rogersi is a moth of the subfamily Arctiinae. It was described by Herbert Druce in 1884. It is found in Costa Rica, Panama, as well as on Guadeloupe and Saint Kitts.

References

 

rogersi
Moths described in 1884